Nick Patrick Gallery is a former American football punter who played for the New York Jets of the National Football League (NFL).

Early life
Born February 2, 1975 in Wintrop, Iowa, Gallery attended East Buchanan High School and joined the University of Iowa team in 1993. Gallery was the Hawkeyes' punter for all four years he was at the school, with 179 punts in 45 games and a 44.5 yards-per-punt average. He also caught a touchdown pass his sophomore year.

Pro career
Gallery wasn't drafted and sat out the 1997 season. In 1998, however, he was signed by the New York Jets and beat out 37-year-old incumbent Brian Hansen during the pre-season, thus becoming the Jets' punter for their opening game against the San Francisco 49ers. But things did not go smoothly for the rookie punter; his first kick went only 34 yards, and his second punt was shanked, landing out of bounds only 23 yards downfield. This earned what the New York Daily News termed "an evil stare" from coach Bill Parcells, and the strong field position led to a 49ers touchdown. Gallery punted four more times, and his best two were his last ones, in overtime: a 48-yarder to Niners return man R. W. McQuarters (who was tackled by Gallery himself) and a 49-yard punt that pinned San Francisco on their own four-yard-line. Unfortunately for New York, on the very next play Garrison Hearst ran 96 yards for a game-winning touchdown. Gallery finished with six punts for 39.7 average, well below his numbers at Iowa. It would be Gallery's only game in the NFL, as the Jets hurriedly re-signed Hansen and the rookie was released.

In 2000, Gallery was signed by the Frankfurt Galaxy of NFL Europe and became the Galaxy's regular punter, kicking 43 times for an unimpressive 39.4 average. He did not return to Frankfurt in 2001, but was selected in the 2001 XFL draft by the Las Vegas Outlaws. Gallery was the 475th -- and last -- player selected, making him the nascent league's own Mr. Irrelevant. He did not make the team, however, and his pro career came to an end.

Nick's younger brother Robert Gallery, after starring as a tackle in Iowa, was drafted second overall in 2004 and played seven seasons for the Oakland Raiders, plus one for the Seattle Seahawks.

References 

1975 births
Living people
American football punters
Iowa Hawkeyes football players
New York Jets players